Sydney Mortimer Laurence (1865–1940) was an American Romantic landscape painter and is widely considered one of Alaska's most important historical artists.

Early life
Sydney Mortimer Laurence was born in Brooklyn, New York and studied at the Art Students League of New York. He married Alexandrina Fredricka Dupre in 1889.

He exhibited regularly by the late 1880s. He and his wife traveled to England, settling in 1889 in the English artists' colony of St. Ives, Cornwall from 1889 to 1898. over the next decade he exhibited at the Royal Society of British Artists and was included in the Paris Salon in 1890, 1894, and 1895, winning an award in 1894.

Laurence abandoned his family and came to Alaska in 1903 or 1904.

Alaska

Laurence was the first professionally trained artist to make Alaska his home. He moved to Alaska in 1904 for reasons still unknown. Records from 1907 show he lived in the village of Tyonek on the North Shore of Cook Inlet in Southcentral Alaska, about 60 miles from Ship Creek where Anchorage would begin years later. Living the hard life of the pioneer prospector, he painted little in his first years in the then-District of Alaska, but between 1911 and 1914 he began to focus once again on his art. He moved from Valdez to the nascent town of Anchorage in 1915 and by 1920 was Alaska's most prominent painter.

Laurence painted a variety of Alaskan scenes in his long and prolific career, among them sailing ships and steamships in Alaskan waters, totem poles in Southeast Alaska, dramatic headlands and the quiet coves and streams of Cook Inlet, cabins and caches under the northern lights, and Alaska Natives, miners, and trappers engaged in their often solitary lives in the northern wilderness.

But the image of Denali from the hills above the rapids of the Tokositna River became his trademark. It is this image more than any other which personifies Laurence for his many admirers and collectors in Alaska and beyond.

Laurence forged a uniquely personal style by applying the tonalist techniques he had learned in New York and Europe to the wilderness of the North. He, more than any other artist, defined for Alaskans and others the image of Alaska as "The Last Frontier."

In May 1927, Laurence married Jeanne Kunath, a French-born artist who had emigrated to the United States in 1920.  He died in Anchorage on December 10, 1940.

Several places were named for Laurence in his adopted hometown.  Laurence Court is a short street in the Bootleggers Cove neighborhood of Anchorage.  Perhaps the most significant was the Sydney Laurence Auditorium, which sat downtown at the northwest corner of West Sixth Avenue and F Street.  This structure was replaced during the 1980s by the Alaska Center for the Performing Arts in what Anchorage called "Project 80s", a large-scale civic improvement program carried out under mayors George M. Sullivan and Tony Knowles; now the Sydney Laurence theater is smallest of three stages at the Performing Arts Center.

References

 

1865 births
1940 deaths
Artists from Alaska
19th-century American painters
American male painters
20th-century American painters
Politicians from Anchorage, Alaska
People from Brooklyn
People from Valdez, Alaska
People of the Alaska Territory
St Ives artists
19th-century American male artists
20th-century American male artists